Problematic with Moshe Kasher is an American late-night talk show hosted by Moshe Kasher. The series premiered on April 18, 2017, on Comedy Central. It was cancelled on June 6, 2017.

Episodes

References

External links
 
 

2010s American late-night television series
2017 American television series debuts
English-language television shows
Comedy Central original programming